Nakash Aziz (born 24 February 1985), also known as Nakash, is an Indian composer and singer. He has worked as an assistant to composer A. R. Rahman on films such as Highway, Raanjhanaa, Rockstar, Delhi 6 and I (Hindi dubbed). He is known for playback performances of songs like "Jabra Fan" from Fan, "Sari Ke Fall Sa" and "Gandi Baat" from the film R... Rajkumar (2013) and "Dhating Nach" from film Phata Poster Nikhla Hero (2013)

Early life
Aziz is originally from Moodabidri, a small suburban town on the outskirts of Mangalore. He belongs to a family of singers. He worked as a composer for jingles and devotional albums before becoming a playback singer. He married Ruby Shaikh in August, 2020. He now lives in Mumbai with his family.

Discography as vocalist

Hindi songs

Telugu songs

Tamil songs

Kannada songs

Bengali songs

Gujarati songs

Pakistani films

Discography as composer

Awards

2014 – Zee Cine Awards – SA RE GA MA PA Fresh Singing Talent

References

Bollywood playback singers
Indian male playback singers
Musicians from Mangalore
1985 births
Living people
Indian folk-pop singers
Telugu playback singers
Gujarati playback singers
Kannada playback singers
Tamil playback singers
Bengali playback singers